Michael N. Grossman is an American film and television director.

He has directed a number of episodes from dozens of different television series, including Grey's Anatomy and the backdoor pilot ("The Other Side of This Life") of its spin-off, Private Practice. His other directorial work includes the series Charmed, Zoey 101, Angel, The Invisible Man, Arli$$, Firefly, Star Trek: Enterprise, Earth 2, Buffy the Vampire Slayer, Gilmore Girls, Drop Dead Diva,  Manhattan, AZ, One Tree Hill, Las Vegas, Eureka, Dirty Sexy Money, Nashville and Pretty Little Liars.

Prior to working in television, Grossman was an assistant director on the films Hide and Go Shriek (1988) and Teenage Mutant Ninja Turtles (1990).
 
Grossman directed the television films Two Heads Are Better Than None (2000), Merry Christmas, Drake & Josh (2008), Starstruck (2010), and One Crazy Cruise (2015).

References

External links

American film directors
American television directors
Living people
Place of birth missing (living people)
Year of birth missing (living people)